Cuyapaipe Mountain or Cuyapaipe Peak is the tallest summit in the Laguna Mountains of San Diego County, California at an elevation of .  It is located within the Ewiiaapaayp Indian Reservation of the Ewiiaapaayp Band of Kumeyaay Indians (formerly Cuyapaipe Band of Mission Indians).

References

Laguna Mountains
Mountains of San Diego County, California
Mountains of Southern California